KTLH (107.9 FM) is an Alpha Media radio station, licensed to Hallsville, Texas, United States, serving the Tyler-Longview area with a Regional Mexican format in full simulcast with its sister station KOYE in Frankston, Texas. Studios are located on Broadway Avenue in downtown Tyler; transmitter site is located in unincorporated Harrison County, northeast of Ashland, Texas. 

KTLH signed on as the simulcast partner of Regional Mexican formatted 96.7 KOYE Frankston "La Invasora", replacing the lost coverage of former simulcast partner 92.3 KCUL-FM Marshall.

History
KTLH was first proposed by Alpha Media in early 2018, and received a permit to construct the facility on June 25, 2018. The construction permit was to expire in June 2021, and also forced Chalk Hill Media to move its displaced Henderson Class D translator, K300CX, which relays AM 1240 KDOK Kilgore, to a new operating channel. Chalk Hill media applied and was granted the move of K300CX to channel 291 (106.1 MHz), making way for the new Hallsville station to sign on.

After a week of testing the new signal with a looped instrumental piece and a basic "107.9 KTLH Hallsville" identification, KTLH joined Alpha Media sister station KOYE as a simulcast partner of Regional Mexican "La Invasora" on February 19, 2020, returning the format to the Longview/Marshall portion of the market.

References

External links

TLH
Radio stations established in 2020
2020 establishments in Texas
Regional Mexican radio stations in the United States
TLH (FM)
Alpha Media radio stations